Senator Koch may refer to:

Amy Koch (born 1971), Minnesota State Senate
Eric Koch (politician) (fl. 2000s–2010s), Indiana State Senate